Ice hockey is a popular sport in the state of Wisconsin. Ninety high schools field sanctioned varsity teams competing in the Wisconsin Hockey Prep (WiHP) leagues of the Wisconsin Interscholastic Athletic Association (WIAA).  Eight "club" non-sanctioned Wisconsin High School Hockey teams compete in the Wisconsin Amateur Hockey Association.

WIAA 
The sanctioned teams compete from the beginning of November until the end of February with maximum number of practices and games. The sanctioned varsity teams are divided into sections used by every sport under WIAA. However, unlike the state tournaments of other prep sports, hockey is not divided into divisions according to the size of the participating schools. All schools, whether the size of a district one or district seven school, compete against one another in state playoffs. Because of this, there are many Wisconsin players and fans from lesser-sized communities who hope that divisions will be instituted for state tournament play.

WAHA 
The "club" teams

Spooner High School B State Champions 1990

Amery High School B State Champions 1991

Spooner High School C State Champions 1984

South Wood County B State Champions 1993

State Tournament 
The WIAA began sponsoring a tournament program in boys hockey in 1971. Superior won the first championship, defeating Madison West, 7-3, in the championship game.

The first State Tournament was held at the Dane County Coliseum in Madison. The tournament has been conducted in Madison every year except in 1974 and 1975 when it was held in Green Bay. The Hartmeyer facility in Madison has been the site of some of the State Tournaments, but the Coliseum has been used exclusively since 1980.

Superior leads in most State championships won with 13. Madison Memorial has won eight, Hudson has won six, and Madison East has won four titles.

Eighteen different schools have won State championships. Superior is the only program to win three consecutive State titles (1994–96). Superior, Madison Memorial, and Hudson are the only programs to win back-to-back titles.

Superior leads in State Tournament appearances with 37. Madison Memorial is next with 30. Northland Pines is third on the list of appearances with 19, and Stevens Point has been to State 17 times. Eau Claire Memorial and Wausau West have made 15 appearances, Madison East and Hudson have made 14, and Madison West has made 12.

Prior to official WIAA involvement in hockey, the Madison schools conducted an invitational from 1964 to 1970 (except for 1966). Eagle River (now Northland Pines) won the first championship, Madison East won the next three, and Superior won the last two." - quoting the WIAA website.

Alumni 

Every season, a "Mr. Hockey" award is given to the most outstanding player in the state as voted upon by the WHCA.

List of finalists and winners.

WIAA Teams

Wisconsin Prep Hockey Boys 
Team and conference data as of the 2021–22 season.

Wisconsin Prep Hockey Girls 
Team and conference data as of the 2021–22 season.

WAHA Club Teams

References 

Wisconsin Prep Hockey
WIAA Boys Hockey
All Time State Champions
All Time State Participants
Individual and Team Records at State Championships
List of Wisconsin High School Teams

High school ice hockey in the United States
High school sports in Wisconsin
Ice hockey in Wisconsin